Goodenia lyrata is a species of flowering plant in the family Goodeniaceae and is endemic to inland areas of Western Australia. It is a prostrate herb with densely hairy, lyrate leaves at the base of the plant, smaller leaves on the stem and racemes of yellow flowers.

Description

Taxonomy and naming
Goodenia lyrata was first formally described in 1990 Roger Charles Carolin in the journal Telopea. The specific epithet (lyrata) means "lyre-shaped", referring to the leaves at the base of the plant.

Distribution and habitat
This goodenia grows in red, sandy soil in the Gascoyne, Gibson Desert, Great Victoria Desert, Murchison and Pilbara biogeographic regions of inland Western Australia.

Conservation status
Goodenia lyrata is classified as "Priority Three" by the Government of Western Australia Department of Parks and Wildlife meaning that it is poorly known and known from only a few locations but is not under imminent threat.

References

lyrata
Eudicots of Western Australia
Plants described in 1990
Taxa named by Roger Charles Carolin
Endemic flora of Australia